The Zoo Gang is a 1985 American teen film directed by Pen Densham and John Watson. It stars Jason Gedrick, Tiffany Helm, Robert Jayne, Marc Price and Jackie Earle Haley.

Summary
Tired of having nowhere to go for fun, Kate (Tiffany Helm), her brother Ricky (Robert Jayne), and friends Bobbi (Gina Battist), Danny (Eric Gurry) and Val (Marc Price) lease a dilapidated nightclub called The Zoo from an old drunk named Leatherface (Ben Vereen). The Zoo becomes their home away from home and an overnight success until the Donnelly Clan catches wind of it.

Little Joe Donnelly (Jackie Earle Haley) and his brawny, but dimwitted twin brothers are a walking, talking trio of nuisance; where they go, trouble is sure to follow. And when they enter The Zoo ripe for a fight, a fight is just what they get. They have pushed The Zoo Gang too far and the battle for the club is on. Will the Gang be able to save their new found club from the greedy hands of the Donnelly clan?

Cast 
 Tiffany Helm as Kate Haskell
 Jason Gedrick as Hardin
 Eric Gurry as Danny
 Marc Price as Val
 Gina Battist as Bobbi
 Robert Jayne as Ricky Haskell
 Ben Vereen as The Winch
 Jackie Earle Haley as Little Joe
 Ramon Bieri as Pa Donnely
 Darwyn Swalve as Goose
 Glen Mauro as Twin #1
 Gary Mauro as Twin #2
 Ty Hardin as Dean Haskell
 Tiny Wells as Hank
 Ramon Chavez as Cop
 William Reynolds as Fire Chief

Awards

References

External links
 

1985 films
American teen comedy-drama films
1980s teen comedy-drama films
New World Pictures films
Films directed by Pen Densham
1980s English-language films
1980s American films